Bar Aftab-e Ali Karami (also Romanized as Bar Āftāb-e ʿAlī Karamī) is a village in Chenar Rural District, Kabgian District, Dana County, Kohgiluyeh and Boyer-Ahmad Province, Iran. At the 2006 census, its population was 53, in 12 families.

References 

Populated places in Dana County